KMAX-FM (94.3 MHz, 94.3 The X) is a radio station broadcasting an alternative rock format. Licensed to Wellington, Colorado, United States, the station serves the Fort Collins-Greeley area. The station is currently owned by Townsquare Media.

History
The station was granted a construction permit on April 21, 2000, and on October 15, 2002, the station was assigned the call sign KKQZ. The FCC issued a license to cover on February 26, 2003, and on May 7, 2007, the call sign was changed to the current KMAX-FM.

On November 11, 2011, KMAX-FM began stunting with Christmas music branded as "Santa 94.3".

The station changed its programming to mainstream rock as "94.3 Loudwire" on December 3, 2012; the name came from the web magazine of the same name owned by Townsquare.

On August 1, 2015, KMAX-FM began stunting as "Spin 94", airing a new format each day with a new format starting with CHR as "94.3 Hit FM", followed by a Radio Disney knockoff as "Hide and Seek 94.3", classic country as "Classic 94.3", and finally Christmas music as "Ho Ho 94". On August 5 at noon, 94.3 flipped to alternative rock as "94.3 The X". The announcement had been made at a listener concert for sister station KKPL on the first night of stunting.

References

External links

MAX-FM
Radio stations established in 2002
Alternative rock radio stations in the United States
2002 establishments in Colorado
Townsquare Media radio stations